This is a list of compositions by Martin Lohse initially categorized by genre, and sorted within each genre by worknumber "W."

List of compositions

Sources
Lohse, Martin (2009). Works 1996-2009 Mirror Music, Copenhagen

References

External links
 homepage, martinlohse.com. Homepage withs scores and parts by Martin Lohse.
 bibliotek.dk (English). Overall website for the libraries in Denmark.

Lohse, Martin